The Chicago Express Loop was a proposed privately funded urban rail transit rapid transit system that will use underground high-speed rail to connect the Chicago Loop to O'Hare International Airport from Block 37. The line was to be constructed by Elon Musk's The Boring Company and use 16-passenger self-driving  vehicles built on Tesla chassis. The proposed vehicles would move through tunnels at speeds as high as 150 miles per hour on a concrete track and complete the journey in 12 minutes, which is 3 to 4 times faster than existing alternatives such as the Chicago Transit Authority Blue Line. The proposed vehicles were referred to as skates and are based on the Tesla Model X. The vehicles would cover an  track with eight guiding wheels, including four traditional grounded wheels and four additional side wheels. It was claimed the Boring Company would pay the costs for the construction of the system in exchange for the rights to the future transit fees as well as advertisement, branding and in-vehicle sales revenues. Chicago Express Loop is the official name of the plan. The vehicles will depart as often as every 30 seconds.

The plans "never moved forward after initial excitement." The project died after Chicago mayor Rahm Emanuel, whose term ended in May 2019, decided not to pursue another term as mayor.  plans for other Boring Company transportation projects around the country had similarly evaporated, with only a small system at the Las Vegas Convention Center operational.

History
In May 2017, The Boring Company first became linked to the plan and made an official bid for the project in November 2017. The vision for electric pod transport goes back to 2017 tweets by Musk. The city's original request for proposal sought bids to bring the travel time from the loop to O'Hare below 20 minutes with departure frequencies of less than 15 minutes and fees that are lower than taxi and ridesharing company fares. Bloomberg broke the story of Boring winning the bid on June 13, 2018. Musk had already applied to build a  tunnel linking Los Angeles to Culver City as a “proof of process” for the technology. The Boring Company had previously received approval to link Washington, D.C. and Baltimore using this technology.

Criticism

The Loop's projected cost of $1 billion was derided by transportation scholars and journalists as being too low by at least a factor of 10 for its scale. The city's aldermen also raised concerns about project oversight and risk, fearing that public funds could be used to cover cost overruns.

Notes

Electric railways
High-speed railway lines in the United States
Passenger rail transport
Proposed railway lines in Illinois
Rail transportation in Illinois
Rapid transit in Illinois
Underground rapid transit in the United States